Girl Stolen is a young-adult crime novel by the American author April Henry, published in 2010 by Henry Holt and Company.

Plot
Girl, Stolen is about a 16-year-old blind girl named Cheyenne who is accidentally kidnapped when a young adult male steals her mother's car. He initially does not know she is blind and contemplates setting her free, but decides against it. He takes her home to a rundown trailer where he does not live alone.

2010 American novels
American young adult novels
Henry Holt and Company books
Novels about child abduction
Novels about blindness